Macroparalepis affinis is a species of fish which belongs to the Paralepididae (barracudinas) family. The scientific name of this species was first published in 1933 by Ege

References

Paralepididae
Fish described in 1933